Judd Clifton Holdren (October 16, 1915 – March 11, 1974) was an American film actor best known for his starring roles in the serials Captain Video: Master of the Stratosphere (1951), Zombies of the Stratosphere (1952), The Lost Planet (1953), and the semi-serial Commando Cody: Sky Marshal of the Universe (1953). He committed suicide in 1974.

Early life 
He was born near Villisca, Iowa, the fifth of 10 children in a farming family, and showed early interest in an acting career. He dropped out of high school to travel to Omaha, Nebraska, where he studied at the Omaha Playhouse.

During World War II, he served in the United States Coast Guard on the USS General H. B. Freeman (AP-143), then moved to Hollywood. While in the Coast Guard, he rose to the rank of commander. His first regular employment there was as a male model.

Career 
Most of his early film parts were uncredited bits, including All the King's Men (1949) and Francis the Talking Mule (1950). However, he got lead roles in Purple Heart Diary (1951) co-starring Frances Langford, and Captain Video: Master of the Stratosphere (1951) the serial version of the adventures of Captain Video, becoming the third actor (after Richard Coogan and Al Hodge) to assume the role of the heroic Captain. Holdren portrayed Aramis in the Three Musketeers adventure film Lady in the Iron Mask (1952) starring Louis Hayward as D'Artagnan and Patricia Medina in the titular role. After The Lost Planet (1953), Holdren tried to maintain a foothold in feature films and TV, but with limited success.

He appeared in a number of ongoing TV series, such as Dragnet and The Lone Ranger, but usually in bit parts, often uncredited. His last significant film appearances were in very minor roles in feature films like Jeanne Eagels (1957), Ice Palace (1960), and The Rise and Fall of Legs Diamond (1960). The rapidity of his descent is indicated by the fact that in Commando Cody: Sky Marshal of the Universe (1953) he plays the lead role and Richard Crane plays his (semi-comical) sidekick, whereas in the TV series Rocky Jones Space Ranger (1953–54) Richard Crane plays the lead role and Holdren has a walk-on part in two episodes as "Ranger Higgins".

After 1960, Holdren became a full-time insurance salesman. During his Hollywood years, he was seen in public as the escort of many different Hollywood beauties, but he never married.

Death 
Holdren committed suicide on March 11, 1974, by a gunshot to the head.

He is buried at Valhalla Memorial Park in North Hollywood.

Filmography

References

External links
 
 Des Moines Register article on Judd Holdren
 

1915 births
1974 deaths
20th-century American male actors
American male film actors
American male television actors
Male film serial actors
People from Montgomery County, Iowa
United States Coast Guard officers
Suicides by firearm in California
United States Coast Guard personnel of World War II
1974 suicides
Military personnel from Iowa